Novo Isioro (born on 9 February)  is a Nigerian visual communication strategist and photographer. Between 2015 and 2019, Novo was Nigeria's Presidential Documentary Photographer in the Office of the Vice President Yemi Osinbajo, SAN. She was the first female to hold this position. She combined this with her role as Special Assistant on Visual Communication.

In 2018, Novo founded the ANISZA Foundation and Gallery, and serves as its curator. She states that the aim of the foundation is to educate secondary school students in Nigerian history using photography, in addition to other tools and by illustrating an understanding of the Nigerian journey, it can advance the cause of Peace and Unity in the country.

Early life and education
Novo Isioro was born in Ogba, Lagos, and raised in a middle-class family. She landed her first job at age 17 just after her high school education and at age 25 she became the CEO of NOVOIMAGES (a photography and image management company located in Lagos, Nigeria). Novo is the only daughter of Dennis Isioro, who is from Isoko-North Local Government Area in Delta State (of blessed memories) and Juliana Adesuwa Isioro, from Edo State with two older siblings. Her father who fondly calls her ‘Novo’ was an Engineer and her mother a farm produce businesswoman.

In 2003, she earned her high school certificate from Shepherdhill Baptist Girls High School in Obanikoro, Lagos. In 2005 she was qualified for an admission at the University of Lagos to study Industrial Relations and Personnel Management (IRPM) but forfeited the pursuit. She quickly opted for her 2nd option in 2005 to study Bilingual, Office Technology & Management from the prestigious Yaba College of Technology and 2010 graduated with an upper credit. She proceeded to earn a certificate in public relations in 2009 from Nigeria Institute of Public Relations just before her college graduation. She proceeded to Anambra State in February 2011, where she started and completed her 1-year National Youth Service Corps exercise, teaching French in Amuobia Secondary School, Awka South Local Government Area. In 2016 she was awarded a scholarship to study Entrepreneurial Management at the Enterprise Development Centre (LBS) of the Pan Atlantic University.

Peace and Unity Project
In 2018, Novo founded the ANISZA Foundation and Gallery, and serves as its curator. She convened Nigeria's first ever unity story exhibition. The aim of the foundation is to educate secondary school students in Nigerian history using photography, in addition to other tools.

Photography
Novo actively got involved in photography in 2012 shortly after her compulsory one-year National Youth Service Corps service. She participated in several photography workshops and master-classes around the world.

Novo's 2012 documentary series “the corporate life of a market woman” led her to the screens of Al Jazeera; airwaves of BBC –the strands; and feature stories in Le-Monde, Paris; Tarkett, Paris, and others.

Work with the Nigerian government

Novo Isioro was appointed as Special Assistant on Visual Communication to the President, under President Muhammadu Buhari administration. A role she carried on with Vice President Yemi Osinbajo, SAN, as his personal photographer from 2016-2019.

Workshops and projects

ANISZA, Abuja 2018
NIPHEC – Nigeria Photography Expo & Conference, Nigeria 2015
Bakassi Pennisul’Art, Cameroon 2014
Masterclass with Akinbode Akinbiyi (Sudanese Photographers Organisation/Invisible Borders) Sudan, 2013
Invisible Borders Trans-African Photography Project 4th Edition Road trip Nigeria-Cameroon-Gabon, 2012
TNI-ACP, Lagos 2014

References

1986 births
Living people
Nigerian photographers
Residents of Lagos
Nigerian women curators
Photography curators